This article lists the team squads of the 2018 Hassanal Bolkiah Trophy. As per tournament regulations, players must be born either on or after 1 January 1997 to be eligible, but each nation is allowed no more than three senior players in their delegation. These players are marked with an asterisk (*).

Group A

Brunei 
Head coach:  Mario Rivera Campesino

Myanmar 
Head coach:  Kyi Lwin

Thailand 
Head coach:  Ithsara Sritharo

Timor-Leste 
Head coach:  Eduardo Pereira

Group B

Cambodia 
Head coach:  Prak Sovannara

Laos 
Head coach:  Mehmet Fatih Kale

Singapore 
Head coach:  Fandi Ahmad

References 

squads
2018